Colón is a municipality and city in the Matanzas Province of Cuba. The city proper, with a population of about 44,000, is the third-largest of its province.

History
The town was founded in 1836 under the name Nueva Bermeja. The railroad, arrived nearby the town still in 1843, reached it in 1851. In 1852, Fernando Diago, the owner of the sugar mill Ponina, inaugurated the first public school in town. The founder's name is don Martín José Zozaya, who founded the town in the former hacienda named La Bermeja. The deed to establish the town was signed in the city of Matanzas in 1836. At the time, don Martín set apart land for a cemetery and a church.

Until the 1977 administrative reform, the municipality was divided into the campos of Agüica, Este, Guareiras, Jacán, Laguna Grande, Oeste and Palmillas.

Geography
Colón borders the municipalities of Corralillo (in Villa Clara Province), Los Arabos, Calimete, Jagüey Grande, Perico and Martí. Its territory includes the villages of Agüica, Banaguises, Guareiras, La Panchita, México, René Fraga, Río Piedras, San José de los Ramos, Santa Gertrudis, Segio González and other minor rural localities.

Demographics
In 2004, the municipality of Colón had a population of 71,579.

Architecture 

The city of Colón since its founding has gone through different architectural styles, some of them on specific buildings and others that were emblematic in different stages, but which left a very strong imprint that identifies the villa. Styles range from Neoclassicism to balloon-frameconstruction, Eclecticism, Art Nouveau, Art Deco, and Rationalism. Different styles of buildings can be seen along the streets. The peak of Neoclassicism can be admired in the Catholic church founded December 8, 1872, and the town hall. In the late 1880s, the atypical Quinta de Tirso Mesa was built, an irrefutable example of the introduction of balloon-frame construction and different cultural influences in the city's architecture. The building no longer exists, but has left a mark on the population and is still remembered for its beauty.

The introduction of Eclecticism to the city's architecture took place with the construction of the School of Arts and Crafts, built between October 16, 1911, and November 28, 1912, although it does not reject some Neoclassical aspects. In the same style are other buildings such as Ferrolana and Provincial Agricultural College (now Mario Muñoz Polytechnic Institute of Health). The period 1930–1959 was important to the city for two main reasons: the opening in 1930 of the section of the Carretera Central highway between Havana and Santa Clara, and the rise to mayor of José Manuel Gutiérrez Planes (1927–1933), under whose mandate several notable buildings appeared, such as the Hotel Nuevo Continental (1937), resulting in a new architectural style in the city, Art Deco, with the Teatro Canal as its finest example. Between 1948 and 1959, Rationalism made its entrance in the city, and the best examples can be seen in the Santiago-Havana and Gran Caridad hotels.

Economy
Colón's economy is centered around agriculture (sugarcane, tobacco, citrus fruit, honey), industry (spaghetti factory), and livestock raising. It is also an important railway center.

Gallery

Notable people
Paul Casanova (1941–2017), baseball player
José Miguel Fernández (born 1988), baseball player
Oscar Nunez (born 1958), Cuban-American actor and comedian
Mario Quintero (1924–2017), basketball player
Félix Ramos y Duarte (1848–1924), educator and writer

See also

Municipalities of Cuba
List of cities in Cuba

References

Colón: en el 150 aniversario de su fundación, published in Cuba in 1986.

External links

 Colón webpage on Guije
 Colón webpage on Facebook
 Colón webpage on Yucayo.com

 
Cities in Cuba
Populated places in Matanzas Province
Populated places established in 1846
1840s establishments in the Spanish West Indies
1840s in Cuba
1846 establishments in the Spanish Empire